Antal Mally (or Antal Maly; 21 September 1890 Budapest – 1958) was a Hungarian football coach.

1927 and 1935 he was the team manager of Estonian national football team. Besides Estonia, he coached also teams in Italy (US Triestina, A.C. Venezia, A.S. Siracusa, SS Catania) and Czechoslovakia (Považska Bystrica, AC Sparta, ŠK Žilina, FC Rimavska Sobota).

References

1890 births
1958 deaths
Hungarian football managers
Hungarian expatriate football managers
Expatriate football managers in Italy
Hungarian expatriate sportspeople in Italy
Expatriate football managers in Estonia
Hungarian expatriate sportspeople in Estonia
Expatriate football managers in Czechoslovakia
Hungarian expatriate sportspeople in the Czech Republic
Estonia national football team managers
People from the Kingdom of Hungary